Tancred or Tankred is a masculine given name of Germanic origin that comes from thank- (thought) and -rath (counsel), meaning "well-thought advice". It was used in the High Middle Ages mainly by the Normans (see French Tancrède) and especially associated with the Hauteville family in Italy. It is rare today as a first name, but still common as a Norman surname: Tanqueray, Tanquerey, Tanqueret. Its Italian form is Tancredi and in Latin it is Tancredus. Its Italian patronymic is also Tancredi.

People with the given name 
In chronological order:
Tancred, Torthred, and Tova (died 869 or 870), Anglo-Saxon siblings who were saints, hermits and martyrs
Tancred of Hauteville (c. 980–1041), minor Norman lord, founder of the Hauteville family
Tancred, Prince of Galilee (1075–1112), a leader of the First Crusade
Tancred, Count of Syracuse
Tancred of Conversano, Count of Brindisi; banished 1133
Tancred, Prince of Bari (c. 1119–between 1138 and 1140), son of Roger II of Sicily, and Prince of Taranto from 1132 to 1138
Tancred of Sicily (1138–1194), King of Sicily
Tancred Tancredi (1185–1241), also called Trancred of Siena, Dominican friar
Tancred of Bologna (c. 1185–1230/1236), Dominican canonist
Tancred Robinson (c.1658–1748), English physician
Tancrède Auguste (1856–1913), 20th President of Haiti from August 8, 1912 until his death in office on May 2, 1913
Tancred Ibsen (1893–1978), Norwegian officer, pilot, film director and screenwriter
Tankred Dorst (1925–2017), German writer

Fictional characters 
Tancred of Salerno, in Boccaccio's Decameron novella collection
Tancred, in the Italian epic poem La Gerusalemme liberata (1581) by Torquato Tasso
Tancred, in the 1591 English play Tancred and Gismund
Tancred, Lord Montacute, title character of Benjamin Disraeli's 1847 novel Tancred
Tancred Torsson, in Jenny Nimmo's Children of the Red King series
Tancred, in the computer game Diablo 2
Tancred, in the video game Summoner, known as the "King of Fleas"
Sir Tancred Beauleigh, the father of the title character in Edgar Jepson's Tinker stories
Tandredi Recchi, the family patriarch in the Luca Guadagnino 2009 film I Am Love
Father Tancred, a minor character in the 2010 film Robin Hood
Tancred Cappelen-Jensen, in Bernhard Borge's novel "Døde menn går i land"
Sara Tancredi, one of the protagonists in the American crime drama television show Prison Break

Band 
 Tancred, American rock band

See also 
 Tancrède (disambiguation)
 Tancredi (disambiguation)
 Tancredo (disambiguation)

References